Maria Emilia Seymour-Conway, Marchioness of Hertford (24 August 1771 – 2 March 1856), nicknamed "Mie-Mie", was a British noblewoman of Italian descent.

Life

Parentage
Illegitimate daughter of Costanza Brusati, by marriage Marchesa Fagnani, her true paternity remained surrounded in controversy.

During their long trips in northern Europe, Marchese Giacomo II Fagnani and his wife Costanza Brusati met in England Henry Herbert, 10th Earl of Pembroke, an English aristocrat well-known for his amorous intrigues with Italian women. The three began to travel together, and the Earl of Pembroke began a secret affair with the Marchesa Fagnani.

In the winter of 1769 Costanza Brusati (who left her husband) and the Earl of Pembroke arrived in London, where he introduced her to a friend, William Douglas, Earl of March, who was among the best-known bon vivants of the reign of King George III and was known as "Old Q" because that letter was painted on the door of his carriage. Soon after, the Earl of March and Costanza Brusati also began a love affair.

On 25 August 1771 at the White's club of St James's, the Earl of March sent a letter to his friend George Selwyn (a prominent politician) that the previous night the Marchesa Fagnani gave birth a daughter named Maria Emilia, and that he was the father. Selwyn took custody of the newborn and brought her up as his own daughter, arising rumours that in fact, he could be the real father.

Custody
Shortly after August 1771, Costanza Brusati returned with her husband who recognized Maria Emilia (known among the family as "Mie-Mie") as his own; however, the child remained in England. They later had two children: Federico (born in 1775) and Antonia Barbara Giulia Faustina Angiola Lucia (nicknamed Antonietta; born in 1778), later by marriage (Signora la) Marchesa Arese.

Costanza, to please her parents-in-law Federico II Fagnani and Rosa Clerici, in 1777 asked that the Earl of March intervene to try to return her daughter to Italy. However, he refused to intercede before Selwyn was nevertheless forced to hand over Mie-Mie in Paris so that her mother could bring her back to Milan.

In 1786, after the death of Federico II Fagnani, George Selwyn arrived in Italy to convince Costanza to give him back Mie-Mie. In the end, the Marchesa accepted, and allowed George Selwyn to appoint her daughter as heiress of his estate; in addition, the Earl of March (since 1778 Duke of Queensberry), one of the richest men in Britain, left much of his fortune to Maria Emilia when he died in 1810. Much of the money which thus came into the Hertford family went towards building the famous art collection now known as the Wallace Collection.

Marriage
On 18 May 1798, Maria Emilia married Francis Seymour-Conway, Earl of Yarmouth, son and heir of the 2nd Marquess of Hertford. They had three children:

Lady Frances Maria Seymour-Conway (d. 1822).
Captain Richard Seymour-Conway, 4th Marquess of Hertford (1800–1870).
Lord Henry Seymour-Conway (1805–1859).

It is said that when King George III was insane, he announced that he was going to take Lady Yarmouth as his mistress.

Separation from husband and promotion in title
Despite her wealth, the Seymour-Conway family never accepted Maria Emilia due to her illegitimate origin, and in the end, this affected her marriage: after the birth of her last child, she moved to Paris, where she remained for the rest of her life. Because she never divorced her husband, when her father-in-law died in 1822 she became the Marchioness of Hertford.

Legacy
The intricate custody battle for Mie-Mie and especially the controversial existence that she lived for many years in London and Paris had considerable echo in the aristocratic and upper-class society of her time. William Makepeace Thackery parodied her husband as the Marquess of Steyne in his masterpiece, Vanity Fair.

Further reading
Guido Bezzola, Franco Arese Lucini, La Piccola Mie Mie: carteggio inedito tra Milano e Londra alla fine del secolo XVIII, Cariplo, 1986 (correspondence between George Selwyn of London and the Fagnani family of Milan concerning the infant Mie-Mie).

References

1771 births
1856 deaths
19th-century British women
British expatriates in France
British marchionesses
British people of Italian descent
Maria
19th-century Italian nobility
Maria
Women of the Regency era